|}

The Harry Rosebery Stakes is a Listed flat horse race in Great Britain open to horses aged two years. It is run at Ayr over a distance of 5 furlongs (1,006 metres), and it is scheduled to take place each year in September. It is currently held on the second day of Ayr's three-day Ayr Gold Cup Festival (previously the Western Meeting). The race is named after Harry Primrose, 6th Earl of Rosebery, a notable racehorse owner of the twentieth century.

Winners since 1988

See also
 Horse racing in Great Britain
 List of British flat horse races

References

 Paris-Turf: 
, 
 Racing Post:

Flat races in Great Britain
Ayr Racecourse
Flat horse races for two-year-olds